Shea butter (or) is a fat extracted from the nut of the African shea tree (Vitellaria paradoxa). It is ivory in color when raw and commonly dyed yellow with borututu root or palm oil. It is widely used in cosmetics as a moisturizer, salve or lotion. Shea butter is edible and is used in food preparation in some African countries. Occasionally, shea butter is mixed with other oils as a substitute for cocoa butter, although the taste is noticeably different.

History
"shea tree") in the Bambara language of Mali. This is the origin of the English word, one pronunciation of which rhymes with "tea" , although the pronunciation  (rhyming with "day") is common, and is listed second in major dictionaries. The tree is called  in the Wolof language of Senegal, which is the origin of the French name of the tree and the butter, .

The shea tree grows naturally in the wild in the dry savannah belt of West Africa from Senegal in the west to Sudan in the east, and onto the foothills of the Ethiopian highlands. It occurs in 21 countries across the African continent, namely Benin, Burkina Faso, Cameroon, Central African Republic, Chad, Ethiopia, Eritrea, Ghana, Guinea Bissau, Ivory Coast, Mali, Niger, Nigeria, Senegal, Sierra Leone, South Sudan, Sudan, Togo, Uganda, Democratic Republic of the Congo, Kenya and Guinea.

A testa found at the site of the medieval village of Saouga is evidence of shea butter production by the 14th century. The butter was being imported into Britain by 1846.

Composition and properties

Shea butter fatty acid profiles
Shea butter is composed of five principal fatty acids: palmitic, stearic, oleic, linoleic, and arachidic (see Table below). About 85 to 90% of the fatty acid composition is stearic and oleic acids. The relative proportion of these two fatty acids affects shea butter consistency. The stearic acid gives it a solid consistency, while the oleic acid influences how soft or hard the shea butter is, depending on ambient temperature.

The proportions of stearic and oleic acids in the shea kernels and butter differ across the distribution range of the species. Ugandan shea butter has consistently high oleic acid content, and is liquid at warm ambient temperatures. It fractionizes into liquid and solid phases, and is the source of liquid shea oil. The fatty acid proportion of West African shea butter is much more variable than Ugandan shea butter, with an oleic content of 37 to 55%. Variability can be high even locally, and a tree that produces hard butter can grow with one that produces soft butter.

Nuts are gathered from a wide area for local production, so shea butter consistency is determined by the average fatty acid profile of the population. Within West Africa, shea butter from the Mossi Plateau region of Burkina Faso has a higher average stearic acid content, and so is usually harder than shea butter from other West African regions.

Shea butter phenolics
Phenolic compounds are known to have antioxidant properties. A recent study characterized and quantified the most important phenolic compounds in shea butter. This study identified 10 phenolic compounds, eight of which are catechins, a family of compounds being studied for their antioxidant properties. The phenolic profile is similar to that of green tea, and the total phenolic content of shea butter is comparable to virgin olive oil. Also, this study was performed on shea butter that had been extracted with hexane, and the authors note that traditional extraction methods may result in higher phenolic levels.

Furthermore, they note that the catechin content alone of shea kernels is higher than the total phenolic content of ripe olives. This study also found that the overall concentration and relative percentages of different phenolic content in shea kernels varied from region to region. The authors hypothesized that the overall concentration of phenols in shea kernels is linked to the level of environmental stress that the trees endure.

Uses 

Shea butter is mainly used in the cosmetics industry for skin- and hair-related products (lip gloss, lip stick, skin moisturizer creams and emulsions, and hair conditioners for dry and brittle hair). It is also used by soap makers and massage oil manufacturers, typically in small amounts, because it has plenty of unsaponifiables, and higher amounts result in a softer soap that has less cleaning ability. Some artisan soap makers use shea butter in amounts to 25% – with the European Union regulating the maximum use around 28%, but it is rarely the case in commercially produced soap due to its high cost compared to oils like palm oil or pomace (olive oil).  It is an excellent emollient for dry skin. No evidence shows it is a cure, but it alleviates the pain associated with tightness and itching.

In some African countries such as Benin, shea butter is used for cooking oil, as a waterproofing wax, for hairdressing, for candle-making, and as an ingredient in medicinal ointments. It is used by makers of traditional African percussion instruments to increase the durability of wood (such as carved djembe shells), dried calabash gourds, and leather tuning straps.

Medicinal
Shea butter is sometimes used as a base for medicinal ointments. Some of the isolated chemical constituents are reported to have antimicrobial, anti-inflammatory, emollient, and humectant properties. Shea butter has been used as a sunblocking lotion with an estimated SPF of 3–4 and some of its components "have limited capacity to absorb ultraviolet radiation".

In Ghana, shea butter, locally known as Kpakahili (Eng. trans. raw cream) in Dagbani, nkuto (Akan) or nku (Ga), is either used as a food product or applied as lotion to protect the skin during the dry Harmattan season. The shea nut tree itself is called tááŋà (pl. táánsì) and the fruit is called táánì (pl. támá). The current northern regional capital Tamale derives its name from a combination of the words "tama" and "yili", meaning "the town of shea fruits".

In Nigeria, shea butter is used for the management of sinusitis and relief of nasal congestion. It is massaged into joints and other parts of the body where pain occurs.

Classification
The United States Agency for International Development and other companies have suggested a classification system for shea butter, separating it into five grades: 

 A (raw or unrefined, extracted using water)
 B (refined)
 C (highly refined and extracted with solvents such as hexane)
 D (lowest uncontaminated grade)
 E (with contaminants)

Commercial grades are A, B, and C. The color of raw (grade A) butter ranges from cream (like whipped butter) to grayish yellow. It has a nutty aroma which is removed in the other grades. Grade C is pure white. While the level of vitamin content can be affected by refining, up to 95% of vitamin content can be removed from refined grades (i.e., grade C) of shea butter while reducing contamination levels to undetectable levels.

See also
 African black soap, a West African soap traditionally prepared with shea butter.
 Shea nut and butter production in Burkina Faso
 Shea Yeleen, a social enterprise that trains women-owned shea butter cooperatives.

References

External links 
 
 

Anti-inflammatory agents
Crops originating from Africa
Shea butter production
Skin care
Vegetable oils

de:Karitébaum#Sheabutter
es:Vitellaria paradoxa#La manteca de Karité